The GTE Northwest Classic was a professional golf tournament in the Seattle area on the Senior PGA Tour. Played for ten seasons, from 1986 through 1995, its inaugural event was at Sahalee Country Club (now in Sammamish) and the last nine were at Inglewood Golf Club in Kenmore. The title sponsor was GTE Northwest, a local telephone operating company headquartered in Everett.

Bruce Crampton was the only multiple winner, with victories at both venues; the only playoff was in 1994, won by Simon Hobday with a birdie on the third extra hole to defeat Jim Albus. The sponsors opted not to renew for 1996 and the event was discontinued.

The senior tour returned to the Seattle area in 2005 with the Boeing Classic at TPC Snoqualmie Ridge in Snoqualmie.

Winners

Note: Green highlight indicates scoring records.

Source:

References

External links
Tournament results (1990-1995) at GolfObserver.com
Inglewood Golf Club – official site
Sahalee Country Club – official site

Former PGA Tour Champions events
Golf in Washington (state)
Recurring sporting events established in 1986
Recurring sporting events disestablished in 1995
1986 establishments in Washington (state)
1995 disestablishments in Washington (state)